Regulatory-associated protein of mTOR also known as raptor or KIAA1303 is an adapter protein that is encoded in humans by the RPTOR gene.  Two mRNAs from the gene have been identified that encode proteins of 1335 (isoform 1) and 1177 (isoform 2) amino acids long.

Gene and expression

The human gene is located on human chromosome 17 with location of the cytogenic band at 17q25.3.

Location

RPTOR is highly expressed in skeletal muscle and is somewhat less present in brain, lung, small intestine, kidney, and placenta tissue. Isoform 3 is widely expressed and most highly expressed in the nasal mucosa and pituitary. The lowest levels occur in the spleen. In the cell, RPTOR is present in cytoplasm, lysosomes, and cytoplasmic granules. Amino acid availability determines RPTOR targeting to lysosomes. In stressed cells, RPTOR associates with SPAG5 and accumulates in stress granules, which significantly reduces its presence in lysosomes.

Function 

RPTOR encodes part of a signaling pathway regulating cell growth which responds to nutrient and insulin levels. RPTOR is an evolutionarily conserved protein with multiple roles in the mTOR pathway. The adapter protein and mTOR kinase form a stoichiometric complex. The encoded protein also associates with eukaryotic initiation factor 4E-binding protein-1 and ribosomal protein S6 kinase. It upregulates S6 kinase, the downstream effector ribosomal protein, and it downregulates the mTOR kinase. RPTOR also has a positive role in maintaining cell size and mTOR protein expression. The association of mTOR and RPTOR is stabilized by nutrient deprivation and other conditions which suppress the mTOR pathway. Multiple transcript variants exist for this gene which encode different isoforms.

Structure
RPTOR is a 150 kDa mTOR binding protein that is part of the mammalian target of rapamycin complex 1 (mTORC1). This complex contains mTOR, MLST8, RPTOR, AKT1S1/PRAS40, and DEPTOR. mTORC1 both binds to and is inhibited by FKBP12-rapamycin. mTORC1 activity is upregulated by mTOR and MPAK8 by insulin-stimulated phosphorylation at Ser-863. MAPK8 also causes phosphorylation at Ser-696, Thr-706, and Ser-863 as a result of osmotic stress. AMPK causes phosphorylation in the event of nutrient starvation and promotes 14-3-3 binding to raptor, which downregulates the mTORC1 complex. RPS6KA1 stimulates mTORC1 activity by phosphorylating at Ser-719, Ser-721, and Ser-722 as a response to growth factors.

Interactions 

 mTORC1 binds to and is inhibited by FKBP12-rapamycin
 RPTOR binds to 4EBP1 and RPS6KB1 directly whether or not it is associated with mTOR
 RPTOR binds to poorly phosphorylated or non-phosphorylated EIF4EBP1 preferentially, which is important for mTOR to be able to catalyze phosphorylation.
 RPTOR interacts with ULK1. This interaction depends on nutrients and is reduced in the case of starvation.
 When RPTOR is phosphorylated by AMPK, it interacts with 14-3-3 protein and inhibits its activity.
 RPTOR interacts with SPAG5, which competes with mTOR for binding RPTOR and causes decreased mTORC1 formation.
 RPTOR interacts with G3BP1. Oxidative stress increases the formation of the complex formed with RPTOR, G3BP1, and SPAG5

RPTOR has also been shown to interact with:
 FKBP1A,
 P70-S6 Kinase 1
 RHEB,
 RICTOR,  and
 mammalian target of rapamycin (mTOR),

Clinical significance

Signaling in cancer 
The clinical significance of RPTOR is primarily due to its involvement in the mTOR pathway, which plays roles in mRNA translation, autophagy, and cell growth. Mutations in the PTEN tumor suppressor gene are the best known genetic deficiencies in cancer which affect mTOR signaling. These mutations are frequently found in a very large variety of cancers, including prostate, breast, lung, bladder, melanoma, endometrial, thyroid, brain, and renal carcinomas. PTEN inhibits the lipid-kinase activity of class I PtdIns3Ks, which phosphorylate PtdIns(4,5)P to create PtdIns(3,4,5)P (PIP3). PIP3 is a membrane-docking site for AKT and PDK1. In turn, active PDK1, along with mTORC1, phosphorylates S6K in the part of the mTOR pathway which promotes protein synthesis and cell growth.

The mTOR pathway has also been found to be involved in aging. Studies with C. elegans, fruitflies, and mice have shown that the lifespan of the organism is significantly increased by inhibiting mTORC1. mTORC1 phosphorylates Atg13 and stops it from forming the ULK1 kinase complex. This inhibits autophagy, the major degradation pathway in eukaryotic cells. Because mTORC1 inhibits autophagy and stimulates cell growth, it can cause damaged proteins and cell structures to accumulate. For this reason, dysfunction in the process of autophagy can contribute to several diseases, including cancer.

The mTOR pathway is important in many cancers. In cancer cells, astrin is required to suppress apoptosis during stress. Astrin recruits RPTOR to stress granules, inhibiting mTORC1 association and preventing apoptosis induced by mTORC1 hyperactivation. Because astrin is frequently upregulated in tumors, it is a potential target to sensitize tumors to apoptosis through the mTORC1 pathway.

RPTOR is overexpressed in pituitary adenoma, and its expression increases with tumor staging. RPTOR could be valuable in the prediction and prognosis of pituitary adenoma due to this correlation between protein expression and the growth and invasion of the tumor.

As a drug target 
mTOR is found in two different complexes. When it associates with rapamycin-insensitive companion of mTOR (rictor), the complex is known as mTORC2 and it is insensitive to rapamycin. However, the complex mTORC1 formed by association with accessory protein RPTOR is sensitive to rapamycin. Rapamycin is a macrolide which is an immunosuppressant in humans that inhibits mTOR by binding to its intracellular receptor FKBP12. In many cancers, hyperactive AKT signaling leads to increased mTOR signaling, so rapamycin has been considered as an anti-cancer therapeutic for cancers with PTEN inactivation. Numerous clinical trials involving rapamycin analogs, such as CCI-779, RAD001, and AP23573, are ongoing. Early reports have been promising for renal-cell carcinoma, breast carcinomas, and non-small-cell lung carcinomas.

See also 
RICTOR
mTORC1

References

Further reading 

 
 
 
 
 
 
 
 
 
 
 
 
 
 
 

Genes on human chromosome 3